Life Express may refer to:
 Life Express (2004 film), a Hong Kong-Taiwanese action drama film
 Life Express (2010 film), an Indian drama film